Paulista is a municipality in Pernambuco, Brazil.

Paulista(s) may also refer to:

Related to São Paulo, Brazil
 Paulistas, inhabitants of the state of São Paulo, Brazil
 Paulista (São Paulo Metro), a railway station
 Paulista Avenue, a street in the city of São Paulo
 Paulista Futebol Clube, a football club from Jundiaí, São Paulo
 Campeonato Paulista, a professional football league in the state of São Paulo

Other places in Brazil
 Paulista, Paraíba, a municipality
 Paulistas, Minas Gerais, a municipality
 Paulista River, a river of Bahia

Brazilian association football players
 Paulista (footballer, born 1979), Creedence Clearwater Couto, striker
 Paulista (footballer, born 1988), Fábio Francisco Barros da Trindade, striker
 Daniel Paulista (born 1982), Daniel Pollo Baroni, manager and former defensive midfielder
 Evandro Paulista (born 1987), Evandro Silva do Nascimento, forward
 Gabriel Paulista (born 1990), Gabriel Armando de Abreu, centre-back
 Juninho Paulista (born 1973), Osvaldo Giroldo Júnior, attacking midfielder
 Marcelinho Paulista (born 1973), Marcelo José de Souza, midfielder

See also